Pain Kuyakh (also Romanized as Pā’īn Kūyakh; also known as Kūyakh-e Pā’īn) is a village in Howmeh Rural District, in the Central District of Rasht County, Gilan Province, Iran. At the 2006 census, its population was 272, in 83 families.

References 

Populated places in Rasht County